Ercole Gaetano Bertuzzi (Bologna, 1668–1710) was an Italian painter of history during the late Baroque period.

Biography
He studied under Cesare Gennari, and became a member of the Accademia Clementina of Bologna. He painted some rooms in the palace of the Marchesi Canossa in Valverde near Cesenatico, and quadratura for the house of the same family in Reggio Emilia.

References

1668 births
1710 deaths
Italian male painters
Painters from Bologna
Italian Baroque painters